The fifth electoral unit of Republika Srpska is a parliamentary constituency used to elect members to the National Assembly of Republika Srpska since 2014.  It consists of the Municipalities of Stanari, Doboj,
Petrovo and
Teslić.

Demographics

Representatives

References

Constituencies of Bosnia and Herzegovina